The Russian women's national rugby sevens team is a women's rugby team in Europe. Since 2013, it is dominating the European Championships, winning the trophy seven times. Internationally, Russia's best performance was in 2013, finishing in the quarterfinals. The team was runner-up at the 2015 Canada Women's Sevens, after defeating Australia in quarter-finals and France in semifinals.

Russia failed to qualify for the inaugural rugby sevens event in 2016 Summer Olympics; however, they qualified for the following Olympic Games in Tokyo.

After the 2022 Russian invasion of Ukraine, World Rugby and Rugby Europe suspended Russia from international and European continental rugby union competition. In addition, the Rugby Union of Russia was suspended from World Rugby and Rugby Europe.

Tournament history
A red box around the year indicates tournaments played within Russia

Summer Olympics record

World Cup Sevens record

World Sevens Series record

Summer Universiade record

European Women's Sevens results

Current squad

ROC's roster of 12 athletes is as follows.

Anna Baranchuk
Iana Danilova
Baizat Khamidova
Marina Kukina
Daria Lushina
Daria Noritsina
Mariya Pogrebnyak
Kristina Seredina
Daria Shestakova
Nadezhda Sozonova
Alena Tiron (c)
Elena Zdrokova

Team management
Head Coach – Andrey Kuzin
Assistant Coach and Head of Performance - Graham Bentz

References

External links
 Profile on the Official Website of the Russian Rugby Federation

European national women's rugby union teams
World Rugby Women's Sevens Series core teams
Women's national rugby sevens teams
sevens